The Dekalb Amberlink is a very popular chicken for free range, cruelty free, alternative production methods.  She is very adaptive to non-cage operation, forages well, and has excellent feather retention.  The feather retention being one of her best features for free range farms and other operations where birds are retained past their peak laying period.  Most popular in the United States in the 1970s, the amberlink is making a comeback as a common choice for small chicken farmers or hobbyists.

Mainly white with some amber brown feathers, the Amberlink is not currently recognized as a standard breed. is often listed as either a hybrid resulting from reverse-crossing of the parent line.  Amberlinks lay light to medium rich brown eggs, with an excellent rate of lay.

External links
BFREPA on Dekalb Amberlink 

Chicken crossbreeds